The Emperor Ferdinand Northern Railway was the name of a former railway company during the time of the Austrian Empire. Its main line was intended to connect Vienna with the salt mines in Bochnia near Kraków. The title is still used today in referring to a number of railway lines formerly operated by that company.

History

The Nordbahn, financed by Salomon Mayer von Rothschild (1774–1855), was Austria's first steam railway company. The first stretch, between Floridsdorf and Deutsch Wagram, was opened in 1837. An extension to Vienna was built in 1838, and the track through Břeclav to Brno in 1839. The first train from Vienna arrived in Břeclav railway station on 6 June 1839. By 1841, the railway had reached Přerov and Olomouc and in 1842 Lipník nad Bečvou. An extension to Ostrava and Bohumín was completed in 1847.

The Nordbahn never directly reached Kraków or Bochnia. The first rail connection to Kraków via Bohumín, Kozle, and Mysłowice was provided by the Prussian Wilhelmsbahn and Oberschlesische Eisenbahn (Upper Silesian Railway). The line from Mysłowice to Kraków was built by the Krakau-Oberschlesische Bahn (Kraków and Upper Silesian Railway). An entirely Austrian rail route from Vienna to Kraków did not exist until, in 1856, the k.k. Östliche Staatsbahn (Imperial and Royal Eastern State Railway), a descendant of the Kraków and Upper Silesian, opened a branch form Trzebinia via Oświęcim to Czechowice-Dziedzice, where it met the Northern Railway.

The Northern Railway company was nationalized in 1907. It also owned many coal mines and other industry enterprises in the Ostrava region. After the nationalization of its railway network, the company continued to operate its coal and industry businesses.

The original Nordbahnhof in the Austrian capital (Vienna North railway station) was destroyed in World War II. It was rebuilt and re-opened in 1962 as Wien Praterstern together with the bridge across the Danube. Today's express trains from Vienna to Brno now leave from Wien Hauptbahnhof, and Praterstern is served by suburban and regional trains only.

Lines in Central Europe built by the Nordbahn in the period up to 1856

Town names are indicated as they were at the time of opening.
Floridsdorf–Deutsch Wagram (1837). First steam-powered railway in Austria.
Wien (Wien Nordbahnhof)–Gänserndorf (1838)
Gänserndorf–Lundenburg (1839). The oldest steam-powered railway in today's Czech Republic
Lundenburg–Brünn (1839)
Lundenburg–Göding–Altstadt–Prerau (1841)
Prerau–Olmütz (1841)
Prerau–Leipnik (1842)
Leipnik–Weißkirchen – Ostrau – Oderberg (1847)
Ostrau–Troppau (1855)
Oderberg–Petrowitz bei Freistadt–Auschwitz; Czechowitz-Dzieditz–Bielitz (1855)
Auschwitz–Krakau. This line was built by the Eastern National Railway in 1856, and later taken over by the Northern Railway.

Telegraph service
The railway used a telegraph system designed by Alexander Bain, in particular along the Vienna to Bochnia line, as late as 1886; the system was slower at messaging than the later Morse systems.

Rolling stock

Steam locomotives of the first period (1837–1842)

 Austria and Moravia
 Samson, Hercules, and Vulcan
 Vindobona
 Saturn and Mercur
 Columbus
 Jupiter, Gigant, Concordia, and Bruna
 Rakete
 Bucephalus
 Magnet
 Nordstern
 Atlas and Vesta
 Patria
 New York
 Minotaurus and Ajax
 Adler and Pfeil
 Baltimore
 Virginia und Florida
 Phönix, Meteor, Titan, and Pluto
 Olomucia and Comet
 Theseus and Centaur
 Planet, Delphin, Blitz, and Neptun
 Cyclop and Goliath

Steam locomotives of the second period (1844–1906)

 Koloss and Elephant
 Donau to Aetna
 Adonis to Ganymed
 Orpheus, Aeolus, and Ulysses
 Prometheus to Andromeda
 Orion and Lucifer
 Aeneas to Orestes
 Nestor to Ariadne, Bihar to Üllö, Jason II
 Austria II to Salamander
 Hebe I, Proserpina and Daphne I
 Vulcan II to Glaucos I
 Fortuna I to Leda I
 Tiger to Mora
 Telegraph I bis Euterpe I
 Vindobona II to Flora
 Antilope I to Mazeppa
 Tiberius to Pilades
 Borsig 815–820, 828–833
 Jupiter II to Clio

Legacy
The Northern Railway was selected as the main motif of a very high-value collectors' coin: the Austrian Emperor Ferdinand's North Railway commemorative coin, minted on 13 June 2007. The reverse side depicts a scene of the steam locomotive "Ajax" steam crossing the bridge over the Danube on the first public run from the North Railway Station in Vienna to Deutsch-Wagram on 6 January 1838. The journey, which caused quite a sensation, was witnessed and cheered by crowds of Viennese who had gathered along its route.

See also
History of rail transport in Austria
History of rail transport in the Czech Republic
History of rail transport in Poland
Imperial Royal Austrian State Railways

References

External links

 

Northern
Railway lines in Poland